Copperbelt South is an electoral district which returns a member (known as an MLA) to the Legislative Assembly of Yukon in Canada. It is an amalgamation of the former ridings of Mount Lorne and Copperbelt. It is bordered by the ridings of Riverdale South, Copperbelt North, Takhini-Kopper King, and Mount Lorne-Southern Lakes.

The district comprises the rural-residential subdivisions of southern Whitehorse, Yukon: Mary Lake; Cowley Creek; Wolf Creek; Pineridge; Golden Horn; Mount Sima; MacRae; and Whitehorse Copper.

The district was first contested in the 2011 election.

Members of the Legislative Assembly

Election results

2021 general election

2016 general election

|-

| Liberal
| Jocelyn Curteanu
| align="right"| 425
| align="right"| 34.9%
| align="right"| +18.6%

| NDP
| Lois Moorcroft
| align="right"| 331
| align="right"| 27.2%
| align="right"| -14.8%

|-
! align=left colspan=3|Total
! align=right| 1,217
! align=right| 100.0%
! align=right| –
|}

2011 general election

|-

| NDP
| Lois Moorcroft
| align="right"| 397
| align="right"| 42.0%
| align="right"| –

| Liberal
| Colleen Wirth
| align="right"| 154
| align="right"| 16.3%
| align="right"| –

|-
! align=left colspan=3|Total
! align=right| 945
! align=right| 100.0%
! align=right| –
|}

References

Yukon territorial electoral districts
Politics of Whitehorse
2009 establishments in Yukon